Hannasville is a census-designated place located in Canal Township, Venango County, in the state of Pennsylvania.  The community is located along U.S. Route 322.  As of the 2010 census the population was 176.

Demographics

References

Census-designated places in Venango County, Pennsylvania